USS Road Runner (AMc-35) was a coastal minesweeper acquired by the U.S. Navy for the task of removing mines from minefields laid in the water to prevent ships from passing.

Road Runner was named after the bird of that name: a speedy, largely terrestrial bird of the cuckoo family, found from California to Mexico and eastward to Texas.
 
Road Runner was built in 1939 as Treasure Island, California, by Western Boat Building Co, Tacoma, Washington; acquired by the Navy on 27 November 1940 from Mr. August Felando of San Pedro, California; converted at South Coast Co., Newport Beach, California, and placed in service on 2 June 1941.

World War II service 
 
Road Runner, a wooden coastal minesweeper, served her three-year, World War II career with the 11th Naval District and the Western Sea Frontier with a homeport of San Pedro and a home yard of Mare Island, California.

Her operations involved daily minesweeping out of San Pedro, sometimes running to Santa Catalina Island or south to San Diego.

Deactivation 
 
Road Runner was taken out of service on 15 September 1944. She was struck from the Navy list on 14 October 1944, transferred to the War Shipping Administration on 5 February 1945, and sold to her former owner.

References

External links 
 NavSource Online: Mine Warfare Vessel Photo Archive - Road Runner (AMc 35)

Ships built in Tacoma, Washington
1939 ships
Minesweepers of the United States Navy
World War II minesweepers of the United States
Ships built by the Western Boat Building Company